FieldLevel, Inc. is an athletic recruiting social network.

Athletes must be invited and by their current coaches in order to be searchable in the private database. College coaches have the option to search for athletes based on a number of different criteria, or can receive recommendations directly from high school and junior college coaches with which they are connected. FieldLevel is free for both athletes and coaches; it is not a formal "recruiting service," as determined by the NCAA.

FieldLevel operates in 15 sports and has helped facilitate over 94,000 college commitments since 2013.

History 
Founded in 2008 by Brenton Sullivan, Kai Sato, Cory Ducker, and Jeremy Weir, FieldLevel was the recipient of the "Best Undergraduate Business Plan" from the Lloyd Greif Center for Entrepreneurial Studies at the University of Southern California, and subsequently raised seed capital funding from Reid Dennis, founder of Institutional Venture Partners (IVP).

In 2009, FieldLevel was hired by the University of Southern California as the primary software provider for all athletic recruiting and NCAA compliance. In 2012, the company expanded their private network into baseball, football, basketball, lacrosse, and soccer.

In 2015, FieldLevel expanded into women's volleyball, its first female sport.

FieldLevel has since expanded and now allows athletes of 15 sports to get recruited, including:

 Baseball
 Softball
 Football
 Men's Basketball
 Women's Basketball
 Men's Lacrosse
 Women's Lacrosse
 Field Hockey
 Men's Soccer
 Women's Soccer
 Men's Volleyball
 Women's Volleyball
 Beach Volleyball
 Men's Water Polo
 Women's Water Polo

References

More References 
 Companies use smartphones to warn coaches of NCAA violations
 How Future Star Athletes Are Being Discovered

American social networking websites
American sport websites